The state of Rhode Island has the following popular media.
== Newspapers ==

Magazines
Motif, arts and entertainment
Providence Monthly
Rhode Island Monthly

Television 

6/WLNE-TV-New Bedford, MA (.1 ABC/.2 Grit/.3 Escape) (WLNE is not a Rhode Island TV station but does serve as the ABC affiliate for the Providence, RI TV Market)
10/WJAR-Cranston (.1 NBC/.2 Me-TV/.3 Comet/.4 TBD)
12/WPRI-TV-Providence (.1 CBS/.2 MyNetworkTV/.3 Bounce/.4 Get TV)
28/WLWC-New Bedford, MA (.1 Court TV) (WLWC is not a Rhode Island TV station but does serve as the Court TV affiliate for the Providence, RI TV Market).
36/WSBE-TV-Providence (.1 PBS)
50/WRIW-CD-Providence (.1 Telemundo)
64/WNAC-TV-Providence (.1 FOX/.2 CW/.3 Laff)
69/WPXQ-TV-Block Island (.1 Ion)

AM Radio 
550/WSJW Pawtucket: Religion
630/WPRO Providence: (NewsTalk 630 WPRO): News/Talk
790/WPRV Providence: News/Talk, Yankee baseball
920/WHJJ Providence: (TalkRadio 920 WHJJ): News/Talk
1110/WPMZ East Providence: (Poder 1110): Spanish 
1180/WSKP Hope Valley: Oldies
1220/WSTL Providence: Spanish
1230/WBLQ Westerly: Full Service
1240/WOON Woonsocket: Full service
1290/WPVD Providence: Rhode Island Public Radio
1380/WNRI Woonsocket: News/Talk
1450/WWRI West Warwick: Classic Rock
1540/WADK Newport: Full service
1590/WARV Warwick: Religion

FM Radio

Internet Radio

Other stations 
Other radio stations from Connecticut and Massachusetts can be heard in parts of or all of Rhode Island. These include, but are not limited to: 980 WXLM, 1320 WARA, 1350 WINY, 1400 WHTB, 1480 WSAR, 89.7 WGBH, 94.5 WJMN, 96.1 WSRS, 98.5 WBZ-FM, 100.7 WZLX, 102.3 WXLM, 102.5 WKLB-FM, 105.7 WROR-FM, 106.1 WCOD, 106.7 WMJX, 107.1 WFHN, 107.3 WKVB, and 107.9 WXKS-FM